The House of Gurieli was a Georgian princely (mtavari) family and a ruling dynasty (dukes) of the southwestern Georgian province of Guria, which was autonomous and later, for a few centuries, independent. A few ducal rulers of the dynasty also rose in the 17th-18th centuries to be kings of the whole western Caucasus in place of the hereditary Bagrationi kings of Imereti.

History 
Bearing a hereditary title for governors (Eristavi) of Guria since the mid-13th century, Gurieli (literally, "of Guria") was adopted as a dynastic name by the Vardanisdze family (ვარდანისძე), hereditary rulers of Svaneti (a highland province in western Georgia). The other notable branch of the Vardanisdze was the Dadiani (დადიანი) of Samegrelo. Both of these branches occasionally used double names: Gurieli-Dadiani or Dadiani-Gurieli.

The medieval Gurieli were vassals of the Georgian crown but, at the same time, seem to have paid some kind of homage to the rulers of the neighboring Empire of Trebizond, whose last emperor, David Komnenos (reigned from 1459 to 1461), is documented as having been 'gambros' of Mamia Vardanisdze-Gurieli (c. 1450 - 69), which is interpreted to mean that Mamia married his daughter or sister or close kinswoman. If the couple had issue, possibly the subsequent ruler Kakhaber (1469–83), the latter-day Gurieli would descend from several Byzantine and Trapezuntine emperors.

In the 1460s, when the power of the Bagrationi Dynasty of Georgia was on the decline, the Gurieli pursued a policy of separation and became virtually (formally acknowledged at times) independent rulers (mtavari) of the Principality of Guria in the mid-16th century, but were forced to pay tribute to the Ottoman Empire, nominally recognizing also the authority of the princes of Mingrelia and kings of Imereti. Throughout the following two centuries, the politics of the Gurieli dynasty were dominated by conflicts with the neighboring Georgian rulers, Ottoman encroachment, and repeated occasions of civil strife and palace coups.

In the 17th and 18th centuries, as many as four Gurieli rulers managed to be chosen kings of the whole Western Caucasus in place of hereditary Bagrationi kings of Imereti. Gurieli kings however are usually characterized as usurpers, or as counter-monarchs of a rival dynasty.

On several occasions powerful neighbors also managed to divert the rule of Guria to members of rival branches of the Gurieli dynasty.

Having accepted Imperial Russian sovereignty in 1810, the dynasty continued to enjoy some autonomy in their home affairs until 1829, when the Russian authorities deposed Prince David, the last Gurieli, and annexed the Principality of Guria. With the death of David in 1839, his cousin David Gurieli (1802–1856), and his descendants were confirmed in the Russian nobility with the princely title of (knyaz) by the Emperor's ukase of 1850.

Princes-regnant of Guria 
 c. 1385–1410 – Kakhaber I; son of Giorgi II Dadiani; eristavi of Guria and Svaneti
 c. 1410–1430 – Giorgi I; son of Kakhaber I
 c. 1430–1450 – Mamia I; son of Giorgi I
 c. 1450–1469 – Mamia II; son of Liparit I Dadiani
 1469–1483 – Kakhaber II; possibly son of Mamia II by his Trapezuntine wife
 1483–1512 – Giorgi I (II); son of Kakhaber II; sovereign prince from 1491
 1512–1534 – Mamia I (III); son of Giorgi I
 1534–1564 – Rostom; son of Mamia I
 1564–1583 – Giorgi II (III); son of Rostom; deposed
 1583–1587 – Vakhtang I; son of Giorgi II
 1587–1600 – Giorgi II (III); restored
 1600–1625 – Mamia II (IV); son of Giorgi II
 1625 – Svimon I; son of Mamia II; deposed, died after 1672
 1625–1658 – Kaikhosro I (III); son of Vakhtang I
 1659–1668 – Demetre; son of Svimon I; deposed, died 1668
 1669–1684 – Giorgi III (IV); son of Kaikhosro I
 1685–1689 – Kaikhosro II (IV); son of Giorgi III
 Malak'ia; son of Kaikhosro I; rival prince 1685; deposed
 1689–1712 – Mamia III (V); son of Giorgi III; deposed
 Malak'ia; restored as rival prince 1689; deposed, died after 1689
 1712 – Giorgi IV (V); son of Mamia III; deposed
 1712–1714 – Mamia III (V); restored
 1714–1716 – Giorgi IV (V); restored; deposed
 1716 – Kaikhosro III (V); son of Mamia III; deposed, died after 1751
 1716–1726 – Giorgi IV (V); restored
 1726–1756 – Mamia IV (VI); son of Giorgi IV; deposed, died 1778
 1756–1758 – Giorgi V (VI); son of Giorgi IV; abdicated 
 1758–1765 – Mamia IV (VI); restored; deposed 
 1765–1771 – Giorgi V (VI); restored; deposed 
 1771–1776 – Mamia IV (VI); restored; abdicated 
 1776–1788 – Giorgi V (VI); restored; abdicated 
 1788–1792 – Svimon II; son of Giorgi V; died 1792
 1792–1797 – Vakhtang II; son of Giorgi V; deposed, died after 1814
 1797–1826 – Mamia V (VII); son of Svimon II
 Kaikhosro, brother of Svimon II, regent 1797–1809
 1826–1829 – Davit'; son of Mamia V; deposed, died 1839
 Sophia, mother of Davit', regent 1826–1829

References 

 
Noble families of Georgia (country)
Families of Georgia (country)
Russian noble families
Empire of Trebizond
Georgian-language surnames